Jeremy Jordaan (born ) is a South African rugby union player for French team Agen in the Top 14. His regular position is lock.

He was announced as a player in SUA Agen on 14 January 2020.

References

South African rugby union players
Living people
1991 births
Rugby union players from Bloemfontein
Rugby union locks
Free State Cheetahs players
Griffons (rugby union) players
Griquas (rugby union) players
Pumas (Currie Cup) players
SWD Eagles players
SU Agen Lot-et-Garonne players
Yenisey-STM Krasnoyarsk players
Rugby Club Vannes players
Tel Aviv Heat players
South African expatriate sportspeople in Israel
South African expatriate rugby union players
Expatriate rugby union players in Israel